The women's 4 x 100 metres relay at the 1950 European Athletics Championships was held in Brussels, Belgium, at Stade du Heysel on 27 August 1950.

Medalists

Results

Final
27 August

Participation
According to an unofficial count, 24 athletes from 6 countries participated in the event.

 (4)
 (4)
 (4)
 (4)
 (4)
 (4)

References

4 x 100 metres relay
Relays at the European Athletics Championships
Euro